Novoivanovka is a rural locality (a selo) in Volokonovsky District, Belgorod Oblast, Russia. The population was 171 as of 2010. There are 2 streets.

Geography 
Novoivanovka is located 16 km north of Volokonovka (the district's administrative centre) by road. Korovino is the nearest rural locality.

References 

Rural localities in Volokonovsky District